The Dorcen G60s is a compact crossover utility vehicle (CUV) produced by the Chinese manufacturer Dorcen since 2019.

Overview

The Dorcen G60s was introduced at the brand debut in 2018. While Dorcen claims to be an independent brand, Dorcen products were obviously based on Zotye products, with the Dorcen G60s based on the Hanteng X5 compact CUV from Hanteng, a sub-brand owned by Zotye.

The production version Dorcen G60s was launched in January 2019, and was powered by the 1.5 liter turbo inline-four gasoline engine code named JT15T shared with the Zotye Domy X5 producing 150 hp(110 kW)/5500rpm with a torque of 215N·m/1700-4500rpm. Transmission options include a 6-speed manual transmission and a 8-speed semi-automatic transmission.

References

External links
Official website

Compact sport utility vehicles
Front-wheel-drive vehicles
2010s cars
Cars introduced in 2019
Cars of China